The Miss California competition selects the representative for the state of California in the Miss America competition.

Miss California may also refer to:

Miss California USA, for the Miss USA pageant
Miss California Teen USA, for the Miss Teen USA pageant
Miss California World, for the Miss World America pageant
Miss California's Outstanding Teen, for in the Miss America's Teen pageant
"Miss California" (song), 2001 song by Dante Thomas featuring Pras
Miss California (film), a 2006 Indian film
"Mrs. California", an episode of the American TV series The Office